The Dark Side of Nowhere is a children's book written by Neal Shusterman and published by Little Brown and Company in 1997. This 256-page science fiction book is for readers aged 12 and up and is about a boy who is tired of being normal, living in a normal town and how all of that changes quite suddenly.

Plot 

Jason Miller, is feeling down. While it seems like he isn't feeling like himself, it quickly becomes clear that he isn't himself, and that everything has changed.  His friend Ethan dies, and Jason begins to not be himself all of a sudden, and starts to wonder who he is. Jason, however, doesn't know. It becomes apoarent that this is not just him; to Jason it seems that everyone in town is acting weird, including his friends and family. 
The reason for this is that his parents and some of the other members of his town are really aliens called Warrior-Fools in disguise. One of the aliens gives the second generation invaders gloves with unique properties, including Jason. Jason's parents take away this glove, and reveal the truth. They are called away, and Jason begins to live on his own. It becomes clear that Jason is meant to be a leader to the second-generation Warrior-Fools, and that they are slowly losing their human shells. Ethan was merely the first to lose this human form.
Jason has misgivings about this, and sneaks out to see his human girlfriend, Paula. Eventually, he asks Ethan what to do about Paula. Ethan suggests that Jason get Doctor Fuller, the Warrior-Fool responsible for the human disguise, to make a serum to do much the same thing that the Warrior-Fools did to become human temporarily, but in reverse. Jason rejects this and breaks up with Paula himself.
On his way back, Jason finds a vial filled with the serum the Warrior-Fools used to stop themselves from reverting to their true forms. Desperate to stop himself from turning into a Warrior-Fool, he injects himself. This halts his transformation temporarily, which Doctor Fuller notices. When Fuller goes to inject him with something to speed the transformation along, Jason resists. This leads to all of the other second-generation Warrior-Fools coming over to apprehend Jason, but Jason arrives back home.
His home contains many vials of the anti-transformation serum, and Jason tries convincing his friend Westley to stop the transition with him. Westley betrays Jason and calls to the other Warrior-Fools. Jason runs, hurrying to a neighbor's house. She notes his resmblance to another Jason, not knowing that that Jason was the one who his human genetics were taken from.
The next morning, Jason's friends, Paula and the other Warrior-Fool Ferrari arrive at the door. They fill each other in on what has happened. Jason goes to the acting leader of the Warrior-Fools, Grant, and the Warrior-Fool's base of operations, against his better judgement to get Westley. Westley and Jason talk as Westley flies a ship out of the base. It explodes in a ditch, and when Jason wakes, he finds the Warrior-Fools around and threatening him. His friends get them to leave, but Jason falls unconscious. 
He wakes up with his parents nearby, taking care of him. It is revealed that he has completed the transformation, but that his parents were secretly working against the Warrior-Fools.

Awards and honors 
2000/2001: Utah Children's Book Award List
2000/2001: Illinois Rebecca Caudill Young Reader's Book Award List
2000/2001: Indiana Young Hoosier Award list
2000/2001: Nebraska Golden Sower Award list
1999/2000: Texas Lone Star Award List
1999/2000: South Carolina Young-Adult Book Award List
1999/2000: Oklahoma Sequoyah Award List
1999/2000: California Young Reader Medal — nomination
1998/1999: Maine Student Book Award List
1999: Hal Clements Science Fiction Golden Duck Award (Young-Adult "Hugo")
1999: Southern California Council on Literature for Children and Young People "Outstanding Book of the Year"
1998: American Library Association YALSA "Best Book for Young Adults"
1998: American Library Association YALSA "Quick Pick" – TOP TEN LIST

References

External links 
 Good Reads: Neal Shusterman
 The Dark Side of Nowhere – Good Reads

1997 American novels
Little, Brown and Company books
American young adult novels
American science fiction novels
1997 children's books